Lars Sørgard  (born 28 November 1959) is a Norwegian economist and civil servant.

He was appointed professor at the Norwegian School of Economics from 1998 to 2004 and from 2007 to 2015. He was appointed director of the Norwegian Competition Authority from 2016.

References

1959 births
Living people
Norwegian economists
Academic staff of the Norwegian School of Economics
Norwegian civil servants
Directors of government agencies of Norway